The 2012 Asian Taekwondo Championships are the 20th edition of the Asian Taekwondo Championships, and were held at Phu Tho Stadium in Ho Chi Minh City, Vietnam from May 9 to May 11, 2012.

Medal summary

Men

Women

Medal table

Team ranking

Men

Women

References
 www.asiantaekwondounion.org

External links
 www.wtf.org

Asian Championships
Asian Taekwondo Championships
Asian Taekwondo Championships
Taekwondo Championships